Pablo Augusto Carvalho, knows as Pablo (born 16 October 1996) is a Brazilian footballer who plays for Kataller Toyama.

Club statistics
Updated to 23 February 2016.

References

External links

Profile at FC Ryukyu
Profile at Kataller Toyama

1996 births
Living people
Brazilian footballers
Brazilian expatriate footballers
Expatriate footballers in Japan
J3 League players
FC Ryukyu players
Kataller Toyama players
Association football forwards